Şehzade Mehemd Abdülhalim Efendi (28 September 1894 – 26 May 1926) was an Ottoman prince, the son of Şehzade Selim Süleyman, and the grandson of Sultan Abdulmejid I.

Early life
Şehzade Mehmed Abdülhalim was born on 28 September 1894 in the Feriye Palace. His father was Şehzade Selim Süleyman, son of Sultan Abdulmejid I and Serfiraz Hanım and his mother was Fatma İkbal Hanım. In 1899, he was circumcised together with Şehzade Abdurrahim Hayri, son of Sultan Abdul Hamid II and Şehzade Mehmed Cemaleddin, son of Şehzade Mehmed Şevket.

Education and career
In 1914, Abdülhalim along with other princes, Şehzade Abdurrahim Hayri, son of Sultan Abdul Hamid, Şehzade Osman Fuad, son of Şehzade Mehmed Selaheddin, were sent to the Potsdam Military Academy as the guests of Kaiser Wilhelm II, where Şehzade Ömer Faruk, the son of Abdulmejid II, later joined them. The Kaiser had admitted these four princes into the Imperial Guard of Hussars, the personal guard regiment of the Kaiser. After graduating from the Potsdam Military Academy he served as Captain at the Berlin royal court.

He participated in the Balkan Wars, that took place in the Balkan Peninsula in 1912 and 1913, and was injured in the war. During the First World War, he was given the command of the automobile detachments with the rank of colonel. Because of being the brother-in-law of the Minister of War, Enver Pasha, he was a popular prince. He supported the Ankara movement, and even helped many of his friends move to Anatolia. By 1918, he was serving as major in the infantry. He was also serving as honorary aide-de-camp to the Sultan.

Personal life
In 1908, Sultan Abdul Hamid arranged his son Şehzade Abdurrahim's marriage to Abdülhalim's half-sister Naciye Sultan. However, Naciye and her family were not told of this decision. When they learned of it, Abdülhalim's father opposed it, as Naciye was only twelve years old at that time. However, his father couldn't opposed his brother, and was obliged to accept it, and so Naciye was engaged to Abdurrahim.

In 1909, after the engagement, Abdülhalim received a letter, which said that he will be killed if the engagement is not broken off. Abdülhalim's mother, İkbal Hanım, informed Sultan Mehmed V about this situation, after which the Sultan ordered the first secretary Halid Ziya Bey, to carry out an investigation. It turned out that Abdülhalim himself wrote this letter as he was against this engagement. After the incident, Sultan Mehmed broke of the engagement, and engaged Naciye to Enver Pasha.

Abdülhalim owned his father's villa in Bebek known as "Nisbettiye Mansion". His only wife was Samiye Hanım. She was born on 1 February 1896 in Üsküdar. They married on 10 August 1913 in the Nisbettiye Mansion. On 21 June 1920, she gave birth to Fatma Samire Sultan, followed three years later by Şehzade Cengiz, born on 23 December 1925. She died in 1947, and was buried in Bobigny cemetery.

Exile and death
At the exile of the imperial family in March 1924, Abdülhalim and his family settled in Paris, France, where he died on 26 May 1926. He was buried in the cemetery of the Sulaymaniyya Takiyya, Damascus, Syria.

Honours

 Order of the House of Osman
 Order of Glory, Jeweled
 Order of Distinction, Jeweled
 Order of Osmanieh, Jeweled
 Order of Medjidie, Jeweled
 Imtiyaz Medal in Silver
 Imtiyaz Medal in Gold
 Liakat War Medal
 Liakat Medal in Gold
 Turkish War Medal
 Imtiyaz War Medal in Gold
 Greek War Medal

Military appointments

Military ranks and army appointments
 1912: Captain, German Army
Colonel, Ottoman Army
 1918: Major General of Infantry, Ottoman Army

Honorary appointments
 1918: Aide-de-Camp to the Sultan

Issue

Ancestry

References

Sources

Ottoman princes
1894 births
1926 deaths
20th-century Ottoman royalty
Royalty from Istanbul